Bader Tareq Al-Fadhel (born April 21, 1997) is a Kuwaiti football player playing for Al-Arabi SC in the Kuwaiti Premier League and Kuwait national football team playing mainly as a winger and central attacking midfielder.

Career statistics

Club

International

Honours
Kuwait National Team
2018 Olympic Return Cup

Individual
 VIVA Premier League Player of the Month: February 2018

References

Living people
Kuwaiti footballers
1995 births
Al-Arabi SC (Kuwait) players
Association football forwards
Kuwait international footballers
Sportspeople from Kuwait City
Kuwait Premier League players